Frank Billings Kellogg (December 22, 1856December 21, 1937) was an American lawyer, politician, and statesman who served in the U.S. Senate and as U.S. Secretary of State.  He co-authored the Kellogg–Briand Pact, for which he was awarded the Nobel Peace Prize in 1929.

Early life and career 

Kellogg was born in Potsdam, New York, on December 22, 1856, the son of Abigail (Billings) and Asa Farnsworth Kellogg. His family moved to Minnesota in 1865.

Kellogg read law and began practicing law in Rochester, Minnesota, in 1877.  He served as city attorney of Rochester 1878–1881 and county attorney for Olmsted County, Minnesota, from 1882 to 1887. He moved to St. Paul, Minnesota, in 1886.

In 1905, Kellogg joined the federal government when Theodore Roosevelt asked Kellogg to prosecute a federal antitrust case. In 1906, Kellogg was appointed special counsel to the Interstate Commerce Commission for its investigation of E. H. Harriman. In 1908, he was appointed to lead the federal prosecution against Union Pacific Railroad, under the Sherman Antitrust Act. His most important case was Standard Oil Co. of New Jersey v. United States, 221 U.S. 1 (1911).  Following this successful prosecution, he was elected president of the American Bar Association (1912–1913).  He was a member of the World War Foreign Debts Commission.

In 1907, Kellogg was honored as a Compatriot of the Minnesota Society of the Sons of the American Revolution.

United States Senate
In 1916, Kellogg was elected as a Republican to the United States Senate from Minnesota and served from March 4, 1917, to March 3, 1923, in the 65th, 66th, and 67th Congresses. During the ratification battle for the Treaty of Versailles, he was one of the few Republicans who supported ratification.  He lost his re-election bid in 1922 and, in 1923, he was a delegate to the Fifth International Conference of American States at Santiago, Chile.

Ambassador to Great Britain

In 1924, he was appointed by President Calvin Coolidge as Ambassador Extraordinary and Plenipotentiary to Great Britain, serving from January 14, 1924, to February 10, 1925.  He succeeded George Brinton McClellan Harvey who served under Warren G. Harding and was succeeded by Alanson B. Houghton so that Kellogg could assume the role of Secretary of State.

Secretary of State

From 1925 to 1929, he served as the United States Secretary of State in the Cabinet of President Coolidge.  In 1928, he was awarded the Freedom of the City in Dublin, Ireland and in 1929 the government of France made him a member of the Legion of Honour.

As Secretary of State, he was responsible for improving U.S.–Mexican relations and helping to resolve the long-standing Tacna–Arica controversy between Peru and Chile.  His most significant accomplishment, however, was the Kellogg–Briand Pact, signed in 1928. Proposed by its other namesake, French foreign minister Aristide Briand, the treaty intended to provide for "the renunciation of war as an instrument of national policy." Kellogg was awarded the 1929 Nobel Peace Prize in recognition. (Briand had already won the Nobel Peace Prize in 1926).

He was associate judge of the Permanent Court of International Justice from 1930 to 1935.

Kellogg was self-conscious about his lack of academic credentials; he attended a one-room country school and dropped out at age 14. He never attended high school, college or law school.  His only advanced training came from clerking in a private lawyer's office. Kellogg grew up in a poor farm in Minnesota, and lacked a commanding presence or the sophistication to deal with the aristocrats who dominated European diplomacy. As Secretary of State, his main focus was Latin America, where he dealt with brutal but unsophisticated strongmen.  His staff provided the ideas, and they appreciated that he was always open, candid, and easy to communicate with. He helped end the battle between the Mexican government and the Catholic Church, but failed to resolve the dispute over ownership of the oil reserves. In the Far East,  he followed the advice of Nelson Trusler Johnson, the new chief of the Division of Far Eastern Affairs. They favored China and protected it from threats from Japan. They successfully negotiated tariff reform with China, thereby giving enhanced status to the Kuomintang and helping get rid of the unequal treaties. As for Europe he was primarily interested with expanding the limitations on naval armaments that been established by the Washington Treaty; he made little progress. Kellogg gained international fame, and the Nobel Peace Prize, with the Kellogg–Briand Pact. It was endorsed by nearly every nation and made starting a war a punishable criminal action.  It formed the legal basis for the trial and execution of German and Japanese war leaders after 1945.

Personal life

In 1886, Kellogg was married to Clara May Cook (1861–1942), the daughter of George Clinton Cook (1828–1901) and Elizabeth (née Burns) Cook (1838–1908).

In 1880, he became a member of the Masonic Lodge Rochester No. 21, where he received the degrees of freemasonry on April 1, April 19, and May 3.

He died from pneumonia, following a stroke, on the eve of his 81st birthday in St. Paul. He was buried at the Chapel of St. Joseph of Arimathea in Washington National Cathedral, Washington, D.C.

Legacy
In 1937, he endowed the Kellogg Foundation for Education in International Relations at Carleton College, where he was a trustee.  His house in St. Paul, the Frank B. Kellogg House was listed as a National Historic Landmark in 1976.

The following were named in his honor:

 Kellogg Boulevard in downtown Saint Paul.
 Kellogg Middle School in Shoreline, Washington, and Rochester, Minnesota, as was Frank B. Kellogg High School (closed 1986) in Little Canada, Minnesota, which had been a part of Roseville School District 623.
 A Liberty ship, the

Papers
Frank B. Kellogg's papers are available for research use at the Minnesota Historical Society.  They include correspondence and miscellaneous papers, State Department duplicates, news clippings scrapbooks, awards, floor plans, honorary degrees, maps, memorials and memoranda.

See also 
 List of people on the cover of Time magazine: 1920s

References

Further reading
 Bryn-Jones, David (1937).  Frank B. Kellogg: A Biography.  New York: G. P. Putnam's Sons. online
 Carroll, Francis M. "Secretary of State Frank B. Kellogg Comes to Ireland, 1928". in America and the Making of an Independent Ireland (New York University Press, 2021) pp. 184–198.
 Cleaver, Charles G. "Frank B. Kellogg: Attitudes and Assumptions Influencing His Foreign Policy Decisions" (PhD dissertation, University of Minnesota; ProQuest Dissertations Publishing, 1956. 590377).
 Ellis, Lewis Ethan (1961).  Frank B. Kellogg and American Foreign Relations, 1925-1929.  New Brunswick, N.J.: Rutgers University Press. online
 Ellis, Lewis Ethan (1968).  Republican Foreign Policy, 1921–1933 online
 Ellis, L. Ethan (1961). "Frank B. Kellogg" in An Uncertain Tradition: American Secretaries of State in the 20th Century. ed. Norman A. Graebner. pp. 149–67.
 Ferrell, Robert H.  Frank B. Kellogg & Henry L. Stimson: The American Secretaries of State and Their Diplomacy.  Cooper Square Publishers, 1963. online
 Rhodes, Benjamin D. (2001). United States Foreign Policy in the Interwar Period, 1918–1941: The Golden Age of American Diplomatic and Military Complacency. pp. 57–72.
 Weber, Eric. "Kellogg, Frank Billings (1856–1937)".  MNopedia. Minnesota Historical Society.

Primary sources
 Kellogg, Frank (1925). China's Outstanding Problems. .
 Kellogg, Frank B. "American Policy and Chinese Affairs". American Bar Association Journal 11.9 (1925): 576-579. online
 Kellogg, Frank B. "Some Foreign Policies of the United States". Foreign Affairs, vol. 4, no. 2, 1926, pp. i-xvii. online
 Kellogg, Frank B. "The World Court". Minnesota Law Review 14 (1929): 711+ online.

External links 

 
 
 

|-

|-

|-

1856 births
1937 deaths
People from Potsdam, New York
Recipients of the Legion of Honour
Minnesota lawyers
Nobel Peace Prize laureates
American Nobel laureates
Presidents of the American Bar Association
United States Secretaries of State
Minnesota Republicans
Ambassadors of the United States to the United Kingdom
Deaths from pneumonia in Minnesota
Burials at Washington National Cathedral
Permanent Court of International Justice judges
Republican Party United States senators from Minnesota
Hoover administration cabinet members
20th-century American politicians
Coolidge administration cabinet members
American Freemasons
American judges of international courts and tribunals
20th-century American lawyers
19th-century American lawyers
19th-century American politicians